Negreira is a municipality in northwestern Spain in the province of A Coruña, located on the Tambre River, in the autonomous community of Galicia. It is found to the west of Santiago de Compostela. It has a population of 6,941 according to the Spanish National Institute of Statistics in 2009. Its administration also extends to nearby villages, such as Trians.

Picture gallery

References

External links
Concello de Negreira

Municipalities in the Province of A Coruña